The 2021 Hangzhou Spark season was the third season of Hangzhou Spark's existence in the Overwatch League. After their first two games, the Spark released head coach Hwang "paJion" Ji-sub, who became the head coach in the middle of the 2020 season, and promoted Hwang "Andante" Jae-hong to interim head coach. However, he was also released in the second half of the regular season. The Spark finished the regular season in fifth place in the Eastern region. Their season ended after they were eliminated in the play-in tournament tournament semifinals, losing to the Philadelphia Fusion.

Preceding offseason

Roster changes 
The Spark entered free agency with five free agents, all of which became free agents due to the Spark not exercising the option to retain the player for another year.

Acquisitions 
The Spark's first acquisition of the offseason was Zheng "Shy" Yangjie, a rookie damage player promoted from the team's Overwatch Contenders academy team Bilibili Gaming on October 22, 2020. The team's next acquisition came on November 16 with the signing of Jia "LiGe" Chengjie, a rookie tank player coming off of a second-place finish with Team CC in Contenders China. The following day, the Spark signed Lee "MCD" Jeong-ho, a rookie support player from Contenders team Element Mystic. The next day, they signed Lee "Takoyaki" Young-hyun, a rookie tank player coming from Contenders team Team Diamond. One days later, on November 18, Hangzhou signed Shin "Bernar" Se-won, a second-year tank player coming off of a 6–15 season with the London Spitfire. The Spark's final acquisition of the offseason came on November 19 with the signing of Seo "SeoMinSoo" Min-soo, a damage player who is considered one of the best flex damage players in the league with a "very deep pool of heroes to draw from," although he did not compete in the 2020 season.

Departures 
Outside of the Spark's free agents, tank player Yu "QoQ" Sung-jun was released from the team on November 12, 2020. None of the Spark's five free agents returned, three of which signed with other teams, beginning with support player Yoon "Bebe" Hee-chang signing with the Washington Justice on November 19. Three days later, tank player Park "Ria" Sung-wook also signed with the Justice. On March 8, 2021, damage player Chon "Ado" Gi-hyeon signed with Overwatch Contenders team RunAway. Two of the Spark's free agents did not sign with a team in the 2020 offseason: damage player "Adora" Kang Jae-hwan and tank player Song "Sasin" Sang-hyun.

Regular season 
After an 0–2 start to the season, the Spark released head coach Hwang "Pajion" Ji-sub and assistant coach Kim "nOrU" Jae-dong on April 26; Hwang "Andante" Jae-hong was promoted to interim head coach and Kim "Mentalist" Chung-in was brought on as an assistant coach.

In the first week of June, the Spark hosted the first live OWL events of the 2021 season, marking the first time that live OWL events took place in China. The live event took place during the June Joust qualifiers; the Spark advanced past the qualifiers with a perfect 4–0 record to the regional knockouts. However, they were defeated by the New York Excelsior in the regional knockouts, 3–1, failing to advance to the interregional tournament. Following the June Joust, on June 22, the Spark parted ways with damage player Kim "GodsB" Kyeon-bo, who had been with the team since their inaugural season.

The following week, one day into the Summer Showdown qualifiers, the Spark released tank player Lee "Takoyaki" Young-hyun. Following a 2–2 record in the qualifiers, the Spark parted ways with interim head coach Hwang "Andante" Jae-hong and assistant coach Kim "Mentalist" Chung-in on July 15, leaving assistant coach assistant coach Chen "U4" Congshan as the only member on the coaching staff. The Spark finished the regular season in fifth place in the Eastern region.

Postseason 
As the fifth seed in the Eastern region, the Spark qualified for the play-in tournament. Prior to the play-ins, the Spark released starting tank player Lee "MCD" Jeong-ho, after he made xenophobic remarks towards a Chinese Overwatch Contenders player. Hangzhou's play-in semifinals match took place on September 5, against the Philadelphia Fusion. The Spark lost the match, 1–3, ending their season.

Final roster

Transactions 
Transactions of/for players on the roster during the 2021 regular season:
On June 22, the Spark released damage player Kim "GodsB" Kyeon-bo.
On June 28, the Spark released tank player Lee "Takoyaki" Young-hyun.
On August 24, the Spark released support player Lee "MCD" Jeong-ho.

Standings

Game log

Regular season 

|2021 season schedule

Postseason

References 

Hangzhou Spark
Hangzhou Spark
Hangzhou Spark seasons